NA-51 Murree-cum-Rawalpindi is a constituency for the National Assembly of Pakistan.

Area
 Murree District
 Kahuta Tehsil
 Sagri Circle Union Councils of Rawalpindi Tehsil
 Kallar Syedan Tehsil excluding Choha Khalsa Circle 6 Union Councils

Members of Parliament

1970–1977: NW-26 Rawalpindi-I

1977–2002: NA-36 Rawalpindi-I

2002–2018: NA-50 Rawalpindi-I

2018–2023: NA-57 Rawalpindi-I

Detailed results

Election 2002
From 2002 NA-36 Becom NA-50 (Rawalpindi-I) (a) Murree Tehsil (b) Kotli Sattian Tehsil (c) Kahuta Tehsil and (d) Choha Khalsa Circle 6 Union Councils of Kallar Syedan Tehsil NA 50 Rawalpindi-I Pakistan National Assembly Seat Winners & History

General elections were held on 10 Oct 2002. Ghulam Murtaza Satti of Pakistan Peoples Party won by 74,259.

|}

Election 2008

General elections were held on 18 February 2008. Shahid Khaqan Abbasi won this seat with 99,988 votes.

Election 2013

General elections were held on 11 May 2013. Shahid Khaqan Abbasi of PML-N won by 133,906 votes and became the  member of National Assembly.

   |style="background-color: #00AAE4"|
   |JI
   |Solat Majeed Satti Advocate
   |7,463
   |3.0
   |N/A
   |-
   |style="background-color: #000000"|
   |JUI (F)
   |Saif Ullah Saifi
   |7,274
   |3.0
   |N/A
   |-

Election 2018

General elections were held on 25 July 2018.

By-election 2023 
A by-election will be held on 16 March 2023 due to the resignation of Sadaqat Ali Abbasi, the previous MNA from this seat.

See also
 NA-50 Attock-II
 NA-52 Rawalpindi-I

References

External links 
 Election result's official website
 Delimitation 2018 official website Election Commission of Pakistan

57
R-57